Defenders Day is a public holiday in Ukraine celebrated annually on 14 October. The holiday honors veterans and fallen members of the Ukrainian armed forces. Its first celebration was in  2015.

History
On 14 October 2014, a decree by Ukrainian President Petro Poroshenko decreed the new holiday "Defender of Ukraine Day" due to the Russo-Ukrainian War and decommunization in Ukraine. This decree was approved by the Ukrainian parliament on 5 March 2015. The holiday replaced the former 23 February's holiday called "Defender of the Fatherland Day", which had its origin in the Soviet Union. As the Ukrainian SSR, Ukraine was part of the Soviet Union from 1922 until Ukraine declared its independence from the Soviet Union on 24 August 1991. On 24 August 2014 (Independence Day of Ukraine) President Poroshenko had proclaimed that Ukraine should not celebrate the holidays of the "military-historical calendar of Russia" but "We will honor the defenders of our homeland, not someone else's".

14 October in Ukrainian history
The chairman of the Ukrainian Institute of National Remembrance, Volodymyr Viatrovych, motivated the choice of the date for 14 October on the Ukrainian historical tradition of honouring the Ukrainian army on the day of the Intercession of the Theotokos. This holiday has been celebrated by Ukrainians since the 12th century. The holiday was especially popular among Ukrainian Cossacks, who celebrated it since at least the 17th century as they believed the Mother of God (also known as "Theotokos") to be their patroness. The fourteenth of October is also the Day of the Ukrainian Cossacks.

During the Ukrainian War of Independence (1917–1920) the military symbolism of the holiday was adopted by the soldiers of the Ukrainian People's Army.

In an effort to adopt some Cossack traditions, the Ukrainian Insurgent Army (1942–1956) chose the day of the Intercession of the Theotokos to be the official day of their establishment.

See also 
 Public holidays in Ukraine
 Ukraine history

References 

Public holidays in Ukraine
Ukrainian culture
Society of Ukraine
2014 establishments in Ukraine
October observances
Autumn events in Ukraine
Recurring events established in 2014
Armed Forces days